February 27 - Eastern Orthodox liturgical calendar - March 1 (February 29 on leap years). 

All fixed commemorations below are observed on March 13 (March 12 on leap years) by Eastern Orthodox Churches on the Old Calendar.

For February 28th, Orthodox Churches on the Old Calendar commemorate the Saints listed on February 15.

Saints

 Apostles of the Seventy Nymphas and Eubulus (1st century)
 Hieromartyr Nestor of Magydos, Bishop of Magydos, at Perge in Pamphylia (c. 250)
 Martyrs Macarius, Rufinus, Justus and Theophilus, in Rome (250)
 Martyrs Caerellius, Publius, Gaius, and Serapion, in Alexandria.
 Holy 6 Martyrs in Alexandria, Egypt.  (see also: October 19)
 Martyr Abercius, by the sword.
 Saints Marina and Kyra, and Domnica, nuns, of Beroea (Aleppo) in Syria (c. 450)
 Hieromartyr Proterius of Alexandria, Patriarch of Alexandria, and six companions (457)
 Venerable Basil the Confessor (747), companion of St. Procopius, at Decapolis.

Commemorated on February 29 / March 13 in leap years; otherwise here on February 28:
 Saint Germanus of Dacia Pontica (Dobrogea, Romania) (c. 415)
 Venerable John Cassian the Roman, Abbot of Monastery of St Victor, Marseille (435)
 Venerable John, called Barsanuphius (Barsus of Damascus), of Nitria in Egypt (5th century)
 Saint George the Confessor, Bishop of Defeltos (7th century) 
 Saint Leo of Cappadocia, monastic.
 Martyr Theocteristus, Abbot of Pelekete monastery near Prusa (8th century) (see also: February 17 and November 10)

Pre-Schism Western saints

 Saint Romanus of Condat, desert-dweller of Condat in the Jura Mountains, Gaul (460)
 Saint Hilary (Hilarus), Pope of Rome (468)
 Saint Llibio, the patron-saint of Llanlibio in Anglesey in Wales (6th century)
 Saint Maidoc (Madoc), Bishop, Llanmadog in Wales was named after him (6th century)
 Saint Ruellinus (Ruellin), successor of St Tudwal as Bishop of Tréguier in Brittany (6th century)
 Saint Sillan (Silvanus), a disciple of St Comgall in Bangor Abbey, Co. Down, Ireland, and his second successor as abbot there (c. 610)

Commemorated on February 29 / March 13 in leap years; otherwise here on February 28:
 Saint Oswald of Worcester, Archbishop of York (992)

Post-Schism Orthodox saints

 Saint Yaroslav the Wise, thrice Grand Prince of Novgorod and Kiev (1054)  (see also: February 19)
 Holy 40,000 Martyrs, under the Mamluk Turks, by burning (13th century)
 Blessed Nicholas of Pskov, Fool-for-Christ (1576)
 New Virgin-martyr Kyranna of Thessaloniki (1751)

Commemorated on February 29 / March 13 in leap years; otherwise here on February 28:
 Venerable Cassian, recluse and faster of the Kiev Caves (12th century)
 Saint Cassian of Mu Lake (Muezersk) Hermitage, disciple of St. Alexander of Svir (16th century)
 Saint Arsenius (Matseyevich), Metropolitan of Rostov, Confessor (1772)
 Saint Meletius, Archbishop of Kharkov and Akhtyr (1840)  (see also: February 12)

New martyrs and confessors

 New Hieromartyr Sergius, Priest (1932)

Other commemorations

 Commemoration of the Great Earthquake at Antioch (1092)
Commemorated on February 29 / March 13 in leap years; otherwise here on February 28:
 "Devpeteruv" Icon of the Mother of God (1392)

Icon gallery

Notes

References

Sources
 February 28 / March 13. Orthodox Calendar (Pravoslavie.ru).
 March 13 / February 28. Holy Trinity Russian Orthodox Church (A parish of the Patriarchate of Moscow).
 February 28. OCA - The Lives of the Saints.
 The Autonomous Orthodox Metropolia of Western Europe and the Americas. St. Hilarion Calendar of Saints for the year of our Lord 2004. St. Hilarion Press (Austin, TX). p. 18.
 The Twenty-Eighth Day of the Month of February. Orthodoxy in China.
 February 28. Latin Saints of the Orthodox Patriarchate of Rome.
 The Roman Martyrology. Transl. by the Archbishop of Baltimore. Last Edition, According to the Copy Printed at Rome in 1914. Revised Edition, with the Imprimatur of His Eminence Cardinal Gibbons. Baltimore: John Murphy Company, 1916. p. 61.
 Rev. Richard Stanton. A Menology of England and Wales, or, Brief Memorials of the Ancient British and English Saints Arranged According to the Calendar, Together with the Martyrs of the 16th and 17th Centuries. London: Burns & Oates, 1892. pp. 88-91.
Greek Sources
 Great Synaxaristes:  28 Φεβρουαρίου. Μεγασ Συναξαριστησ.
  Συναξαριστής. 28 Φεβρουαρίου. Ecclesia.gr. (H Εκκλησια τησ Ελλαδοσ). 
Russian Sources
  13 марта (28 февраля). Православная Энциклопедия под редакцией Патриарха Московского и всея Руси Кирилла (электронная версия). (Orthodox Encyclopedia - Pravenc.ru).
  28 февраля (ст.ст.) 13 марта 2014 (нов. ст.). Русская Православная Церковь Отдел внешних церковных связей.

February in the Eastern Orthodox calendar